In many video games of the 1980s and 1990s, passwords are used to select a starting level, or to restore the game to a particular state visited in a previous playthrough. Such passwords are given to the player when a level is beaten, or when all continues are used. Overlapping in many ways with cheat codes, passwords are distinguished from codes in that they are revealed to the player outright rather than hidden within the game code, and using them is generally not considered cheating. They are rarely used today, having been largely supplanted by saved games.

Rationale and history
Passwords were used when storage was either impossible or expensive. On early ROM cartridges, games could not be saved without an additional memory card being integrated into the game, significantly increasing (often doubling) the manufacturing cost. By using passwords, nothing needed to be written on the cartridge, as the password itself contained all the information needed to continue the game, and thus a memory card was not necessary, lowering costs. These costs were particularly a concern on low volume titles by smaller third-party developers.

With the advent of optical based media at the tail end of the 16-bit era, data could not be stored on the game media, and a saved game required the introduction of non-volatile memory to the console either in the form of internal memory or memory cards which stored game data once the system was powered off; passwords avoided the need for this.

In the fifth generation of video game consoles, passwords retained practical use in conserving memory blocks. Platform and puzzle games often required no data to be preserved other than the level achieved – which was easily encoded in a simple password – and thus using one of the limited blocks for this data was seen as wasteful. More importantly, some consoles of the time, such as the PlayStation and Jaguar CD, had no memory available for saves out of the box, and the need to purchase separately sold memory cards could be a deterrent to purchasing a game.

Some modern video games still use passwords as a homage to the early days of gaming, or for some other advantage, but they are now rare.

Passwords, as with saved games, have been primarily used for home systems, but have found some use in arcades, as in Gauntlet Legends, which uses passwords to record player statistics/abilities and progress.

Non-alphanumeric

Non-alphanumeric password systems are possible. Instead of a string of letters and numbers, grid-based systems achieved some popularity in 1980s, which often took the form of a table of colored dots or other icons. These tables were generally much smaller than the virtual keyboard required for alphanumeric passwords, making password entry more efficient. Additionally, grid-based systems avoided the potential for the player confusing similar-looking alphanumeric symbols (e.g. lowercase "L", uppercase "I", and the numeral "1" appear identical or nearly identical on many displays).

Password length
If player progress consists only of one variable, such as the stage number, then a short password such as a single word suffices.

Algorithms can compress, encrypt, and otherwise manipulate save data containing many large variables. The less the algorithm encrypts, the more easily players may notice patterns, such as an increment by one every level. They can then exploit these patterns to cheat or even beat the game. With a little luck, even a long password can be discovered by chance, as was the case for the infamous JUSTIN BAILEY code from Metroid.

While any save information is convertible into password form, it is practical only for game progress consisting of fewer or smaller variables. Overlong passwords needed by games such as RPGs with many large variables eventually cancels out the usability benefits from generating a password.

Combinatorial linguistics

Since a player works with a password one character unit at a time, one way to simplify a password for a player's use would be to shorten it, to minimize the password length and maximize the pool of available symbols, making it informationally denser.

Languages with more graphemes can more readily exploit this. Enix's 1986 and 1987 Japanese Famicom releases of its highly successful first two Dragon Quest RPGs used passwords composed from a set of 64 hiragana. However, the 1988 third game in the series and Nintendo's international releases of the first two for the NES in 1989 and 1990 used battery-backed saves.

This may be partly explained using Anglo-Japanese comparative symbology:

English • 62 symbols if using all of (not including punctuation):
numerals • 10 digits
alphabet • 26 letters (or 52 with both cases)
Japanese • 228 symbols if using all of (not including punctuation or kanji):
numerals • 10 digits
hiragana and katakana • 46 to 83 each (92 to 166 combined)
46 basic kana (or 48 with rarely used ゐ and ゑ)
9 or 10 small kana, "ぁぃぅぇぉっゃゅょ" and the rarely used "ゎ"
25 voiced kana, such as "が" and "ぱ"
romaji • 26 letters (or 52 with both cases)

Modern use
The use of passwords for saving progress has been generally replaced by saves, while passwords have taken on the distinct role of adding in extra characters, vehicles, or weapons. For example, in Animal Crossing, passwords are used for giving items to friends; players could trade in an item for a password, and their friend could enter in the password to receive that same item. A handful of games, such as the PC-Engine version of Ys I & II contained a password feature in addition to the conventional game save. In Shin Megami Tensei: Strange Journey, every demon that the player can own has a unique password of thirty-two characters that can be used to summon that demon from the Compendium even if the player has never encountered it. If a demon created through fusion has different skills from its normal version, a different password will be stored in the Compendium along with the original password, allowing players to store custom demons.

Many arcade games, such as the Initial D arcade game, use hashes to allow people to submit their fastest lap times to online score tables (though Initial D uses a proprietary magnetic card to save user data). The hash is used to stop people forging lap times. The password can then be entered on a website to have the time added online. An alternative to this is for the arcade consoles to be networked (internet-connected), as via Konami's e-Amusement system.

It is also common in Warcraft 3 mods, where saving data between games is virtually impossible, but generating and reading passwords is not.

See also
 Saved game

References

External links
Video Game Password Generators
NES Password Generators and Trivia
IGN's review of GT Advance Championship Racing - a game which was seriously hurt by the removal of a game save in favor of a password system

Video game design